The Vienna Gesera (meaning "Viennese Decree") was a persecution of Jews in Austria in 1420–21 on the orders of Duke Albert V. The persecution, at first consisting of exile, forced conversion and imprisonment, culminated in the execution of over 200 Jews. Some Jews escaped abroad, while others committed suicide. The Viennese Jewish community of about 1,500 effectively ceased to exist and its properties were confiscated by the duke. The name derives from a contemporary Jewish chronicle entitled Wiener Gesera.

The persecution took place against a background of suspicion that the Jews were giving support to the Hussites and jealousy at the increasing wealth of the Viennese Jews. Duke Albert, moreover, owed more money to the Jews than he could repay. The persecution began with a rumour at Easter 1420 that a certain Jew named Israel had purchased some eucharistic bread for desecration. On 23 May 1420, Albert V ordered a roundup of Jews.

In the beginning were many imprisonments, with starvations and tortures leading to executions. Children were deprived and deceived into eating unclean foods, those that were defiant were "sold into slavery" or baptized against their will. The poor Jews were driven out, while the wealthy were imprisoned. The few Jews still living in freedom took refuge in the Or-Sarua Synagoge at Judenplatz, in what would become a three-day siege, through hunger and thirst, leading to a collective suicide. The contemporary Jewish chronicle reports that the Rabbi Jonah set the Synagogue on fire for the Jews at Or-Sarua to die as martyrs. This was a form of Kiddush Hashem in order to escape religious persecution and compulsory baptism. At the instigation of the Italian rabbinate, Pope Martin V condemned the forced conversion of Jews with threats of excommunication. His intervention, however, was ineffective.

At the command of Duke Albert V, the approximately two hundred remaining survivors of the Jewish community were accused of crimes such as dealing arms to the Hussites and host desecration, and on 12 March 1421 were led to the pyre at the so-called goose pasture (Gänseweide) in Erdberg and burned alive. The duke decided at that time that no more Jews would be allowed in Austria henceforth. The properties that were left behind were confiscated, the houses were sold or given away, and the stones of the synagogue were taken for the building of the old Viennese university. However, Jewish settlement in Vienna would not permanently cease. A second major ghetto would emerge in Vienna's Leopoldstadt district in the seventeenth century.

References 

Jewish Austrian history
Medieval Austria
Medieval Jewish history
Christian anti-Judaism in the Middle Ages
1420
1421
15th-century conflicts